Karanganyar is a town and the capital of Karanganyar Regency, the town located in Central Java, Indonesia.

Administrative villages
Karanganyar consists of 12 villages (kelurahan or desa) namely:
 Bejen
 Bolong
 Cangakan
 Delingang
 Gayamdompo
 Gedong
 Jantiharjo
 Jungke
 Karanganyar
 Lalung
 Popongan
 Tegalgede

References

External links 

  

Districts of Central Java
Regency seats of Central Java
Populated places in Central Java